Legs Diamond is a musical with a book by Harvey Fierstein and Charles Suppon based on the Warner Brothers film The Rise and Fall of Legs Diamond (1960), with a screenplay by Joseph Landon. The music and lyrics are by Peter Allen, who starred as the title character in the Broadway production.

The Almost Totally Fictitious Musical History of Legs Diamond follows the travails of its title character, a Depression-era mobster who wants to break into show business.

Production  
The musical opened on Broadway at the Mark Hellinger Theatre on December 26, 1988 and closed on February 19, 1989 after 64 performances and 72 previews (far more than the usual 16-24 preview periods). Directed by Robert Allan Ackerman with choreography by Alan Johnson, the scenic design was by David Mitchell, costume design by Willa Kim, and lighting design by Jules Fisher and Peggy Eisenhauer (Associate).  The cast included Peter Allen (Jack Diamond), Julie Wilson (Flo), Randall Edwards (Kiki Roberts), Brenda Braxton (Madge), Joe Silver (Arnold Rothstein), Jim Fyfe (Moran), Christian Kauffmann (Bones), Pat McNamara (Devane), and Raymond Serra (Augie), Jonathan Cerullo (Tango Dancer).

The reviews were unanimously negative, with particular disbelief at Peter Allen's attempts to play so totally against type as a suave lothario. Frank Rich commented that the evening's most compelling drama was watching Allen figure out "what to do with his hands".  The failure of the musical was so total that it compelled the Nederlander Organization to finally sell the beloved but flop-prone Mark Hellinger Theatre to the Times Square Church, which still owns it.

On Sunday, December 3, 2017, Legs Diamond celebrated its 30th anniversary with a reunion concert at Feinstein's/54 Below, and many of the original cast members reunited to perform. It was directed and produced by original cast member Jonathan Stuart Cerullo and starred Christine Andreas, Brenda Braxton, Randall Edwards, and Bob Stillman.

Song list 

Act One   
Prelude/When I Get My Name in Lights - Orchestra, Jack, Ensemble
Speakeasy - Madge, Ensemble
Applause - Flo, The Hotsy Totsy Girls
Knockers - Jack, The Hotsy Totsy Girls
I Was Made for Champagne – Kiki, The Tropicabana Dancers 
Tropican Rhumba – Jack, Kiki
Sure Thing Baby – Jack
Speakeasy Christmas – The Hotsy Totsy Girls
Charge It to A. R. – Augie, Bones, Moran, A. R., A.R.'s Gang 
Only an Older Woman – Jack, Flo
Taxi Dancers' Tango – Jack, Ensemble
Only Steal from Thieves – Jack, Kiki
When I Get My Name in Lights (reprise) – Jack, Company

Act Two
Cut of the Cards – Jack, Company
Gangland Chase – Orchestra
Now You See Me, Now You Don't – Jack, Kiki, Ensemble 
The Man Nobody Could Love – Kiki, Flo, Madge 
The Music Went Out of My Life – Flo
Say It Isn't So – Jack, Company
Say It Isn't So (reprise) – Ensemble
All I Wanted Was the Dream – Jack
Finale – Jack, Flo, Company

"Come Save Me", a song cut from the show, had been recorded by Allen and Niki Gregoroff on one of Allen's albums in 1985. It also was included in The Boy from Oz, a musical about Allen.

Awards and nominations

Original Broadway production

Discography
The original Broadway cast recording was released by RCA Victor (RCA Victor 7983-2-RC), and it now is out of print. The most famous song "When I Get My Name in Lights" was re-done by Allen and his friend Harry Connick, Jr. on Allen's last album Making Every Moment Count. It also was included in the stage musical "The Boy from Oz," where it’s sung by the young Peter.

 Standard Edition
 Peter Allen - "Prelude/When I Get My Name in Lights"	(4:56)
 Brenda Braxton - Speakeasy" (4:11)
 Julie Wilson & Peter Allen - "Applause/Knockers"	(5:41)
 Randall Edwards - "I Was Made for Champagne" (5:07)
 Peter Allen - "Sure Thing Baby" (3:58)
 Carol Ann Baxter, Colleen Dunn, Deanna Dys, Gwendolyn Miller & Wendy Waring - "Speakeasy Christmas" (0:44)
 Raymond Serra, Christian Kauffmann, Jim Fyfe & Joe Silver	- "Charge It to A.R." (2:21)
 Peter Allen & Julie Wilson - "Only an Older Woman" (3:39)
 Peter Allen & Randall Edwards - "Only Steal from Thieves" (3:28)
 Peter Allen - "When I Get My Name in Lights (Reprise)" (1:42)
 Peter Allen - "Cut of the Cards" (2:25)
 "Gangland Chase (Instrumental)" (3:40)
 Peter Allen & Randall Edwards - "Now You See Me, Now You Don't" (3:37)
 Randall Edwards, Julie Wilson & Brenda Braxton - "The Man Nobody Could Love" (4:25)
 Julie Wilson - "The Music Went Out of My Life" (4:40)
 Peter Allen - "Say It Isn't So" (4:46)
 Legs Diamond Original Broadway Cast	- "Say It Isn't So (Reprise)" (1:12)
 Peter Allen - "All I Wanted Was the Dream" (2:58)
 Peter Allen & Julie Wilson - "Finale" (1:43)

References

External links
 Internet Broadway Database listing

1988 musicals
Broadway musicals
Musicals based on films
Cultural depictions of Legs Diamond
Cultural depictions of Arnold Rothstein
Plays based on real people
Biographical plays about criminals